The Boucles de la Mayenne is a road bicycle race held annually in the Mayenne department and Pays de la Loire region in France. It was first held in 1975 and from 2006 until 2019, it was organised as a 2.1 event on the UCI Europe Tour. The race became part of the new UCI ProSeries in 2020, although that year's edition was cancelled due to the COVID-19 pandemic in France.

Winners

References

External links
  

 
UCI Europe Tour races
Recurring sporting events established in 1975
1975 establishments in France
Cycle races in France